Castor Sixto Cantero (born 12 January 1918, date of death unknown) was a Paraguayan football midfielder.

Cantero was part of the Paraguay national football team that participated in the 1950 FIFA World Cup and the Copa América tournaments of 1946 and 1949. He has 34 caps and no goals playing for Paraguay between 1942 and 1950. During most of his career he played for Olimpia Asunción. Cantero is deceased.

References

External links

1918 births
Year of death missing
Paraguay international footballers
1950 FIFA World Cup players
Paraguayan footballers
Club Olimpia footballers
Association football midfielders